Albert Herring, Op. 39, is a chamber opera in three acts by Benjamin Britten.

Composed in the winter of 1946 and the spring of 1947, this comic opera was a successor to his serious opera The Rape of Lucretia. The libretto, by Eric Crozier, was based on Guy de Maupassant's novella Le Rosier de Madame Husson, with the action transposed to an English setting.

Composition history
After having composed and staged The Rape of Lucretia, Britten decided he should attempt a comedy, preferably set in England. Crozier suggested adapting the Maupassant short story Le rosier de Madame Husson and transplanting it to the Suffolk landscape already familiar to Britten from his home in Snape. Britten composed Albert Herring at his home, The Old Mill at Snape, in the winter of 1946 and the spring of 1947. He scored the opera for the same instrumental forces he had used in his first chamber opera The Rape of Lucretia, intending it like the earlier opera for performance by the English Opera Group.

Performance history and reception
The opera premiered on 20 June 1947 at Glyndebourne, conducted by the composer. According to one writer, the owner and founder of Glyndebourne, John Christie, "disliked it intensely and is said to have greeted members of the first night audience with the words: 'This isn't our kind of thing, you know'." Some 38 years later Glyndebourne's 1985 production was "one of the most successful the opera has had".

The opera received its U.S. premiere on 8 August 1949 at the Tanglewood Music Festival. In 1949, Britten's English Opera Group toured with both Rape of Lucretia and Albert Herring, giving ten performances between 12 and 23 September in Copenhagen and Oslo. An almost complete recording of one of the Copenhagen performances has been released commercially.

Sviatoslav Richter called it "the greatest comic opera of the century" and in 1983 staged Albert Herring as part of the December Nights Festival at Moscow's Pushkin Museum.

The opera was performed at Buenos Aires's Teatro Colón in 1972. The Chicago premiere was given by Chicago Opera Theater in 1979. In 2008–2010, over 55 performances were given by companies such as those at Glyndebourne and the Portland Opera in Oregon (2008 season); the Opéra-Comique in Paris and the Opéra de Normandie in Rouen (2009);and, for 2010, at the Landestheater in Linz, the Finnish National Opera in Helsinki and the Santa Fe Opera. The Santa Fe production was given by the Los Angeles Opera in 2011. Vancouver Opera presented the work, in a co-production with Pacific Opera Victoria, in 2013.

Australian television production
Australian television aired a live performance in 1959. This was at a time when Australian TV productions were rare.

Roles

Synopsis
Time: April and May 1900
Place: Loxford, a small market town in East Suffolk, England

Act 1
Housekeeper Florence Pike is run ragged. Her mistress Lady Billows is organising the annual May Day festival and has gathered all the important people of the village to elect the May Queen. But Florence has dug up dirt on every single girl nominated, proving that none is worthy to wear the once-much-coveted crown. Lady Billows is depressed. Superintendent Budd suggests that the solution may be to select, this year, a May King instead. He knows of a young man in town who is as certainly virginal as the girls are not: Albert Herring.

Working at the greengrocer's, Albert is teased for his timidity by the easygoing butcher Sid. Sid's girlfriend Nancy comes in to do some shopping, and the couple shares a tender moment while Albert looks on. The lovers leave, and Albert reflects on his miserable existence under his mother's thumb. The Festival Committee arrives with the news of his selection as May King. Mrs. Herring is thrilled by the prize of £25, but Albert balks at being paraded in swan-white and mother and son quarrel to the mocking commentary of the village children.

Act 2
It is the day of the festival. Sid and Nancy are preparing the banquet tent, and they take the opportunity to slip some rum into Albert's lemonade glass. Together with a crown of flowers and the gruesome but improving Foxe's The Book of Martyrs, Albert is awarded twenty-five pounds in prize money. Asked to make a speech, he is tongue-tied and becomes an object of pity at the feast in his honour, but after draining his lemonade glass (which Britten satirically underlines with a Tristan chord, alluding to the philter in that opera). and having a fit of hiccups he manages a few hip-hip, hurrahs.

That night, Albert arrives home alone and quite drunk. In the street, Sid keeps a rendezvous with Nancy, and the two discuss their sympathetic pity for Albert before going off together. This is the breaking point for Albert, who has overheard. He takes the prize money and heads out looking for adventure.

Act 3
The next morning Albert has not returned, and the village is in a panic. Superintendent Budd is leading the search, while the guilt-stricken Nancy tends to Mrs. Herring. A boy shouts that a "Big White Something" has been found in a well, and the village worthies file in to break the news en masse that Albert's crown of flowers has been discovered, crushed by a cart. A lengthy threnody of grief follows, but is interrupted by the surprise return of Albert. He thanks the Festival Committee for funding his night out. They, in turn, are outraged by his tale of drunken debauchery and leave in a huff. Albert finally stands up to his mother and invites the village children into the shop to enjoy some fruit at his expense.

Musical style and character themes
Albert Herring is a musically complex work, despite its somewhat light-hearted subject matter. The text is genuinely humorous, and the score, while matching the text in character, includes myriad musical quotations as well as some complex forms. Like Peter Grimes and other works by Britten, this opera explores society's reaction to an odd individual, although, in this case at least, it is from a generally humorous and lighthearted perspective. Some of Britten's contemporaries saw in the title character a satirical self-portrait of the composer.

Recordings 
There are five audio recordings of Albert Herring and one DVD recording, with the following artists:

References
Notes

Additional sources
Holden, Amanda (ed.), The New Penguin Opera Guide, New York: Penguin Putnam, 2001. 
Recordings of Albert Herring on operadis-opera-discography.org.uk
Whittall, Arnold, "Albert Herring" in Stanley Sadie, (Ed.),  The New Grove Dictionary of Opera, Vol. One, pp. 54–55. London: Macmillan Publishers, Inc. 1998    

Operas by Benjamin Britten
English-language operas
English comic operas
Chamber operas
1947 operas
Operas
Operas set in England
Operas based on novels